The Romanian rural systematization program was a social engineering program undertaken by Nicolae Ceaușescu's Romania primarily at the end of the 1980s. The legal framework for this program was established as early as 1974, but it only began in earnest in March 1988, after the Romanian authorities renounced most favoured nation status and the American human rights scrutiny which came with it. The declared aim of this program was to eliminate the differences between urban and rural, by the means of razing half of Romania's 13,000 villages and moving their residents into hundreds of new "agro-industrial centers" by 2000. The program gained notoriety in Europe, with protests from multiple countries – chiefly Hungary – as well as a Belgian-led initiative to save the Romanian villages by "adopting" them. Within a year, on 18 April 1989, the first batch of 23 new agro-industrial towns was completed. Only one new town was created between 1974 and 1988, as Ceaușescu focused his attention on other projects. Although cut short by the Romanian Revolution in December 1989, at least three more rural settlements in an advanced state of systematization were, ultimately, transformed into towns as well.

Background

Nicolae Ceaușescu's 1988 idea to raze about half of Romania's 13,000 villages and rebuild others into "agro-industrial centers" was not new. It had been written into law in 1974. At that time, about 3,000 villages were scheduled to die out gradually, while 300–400 more were to be transformed into towns. However, industrial construction assumed priority, overshadowing the rural reconstruction and resettlement program, which was not pursued with any vigor. In the spring of 1988, however, the rural systematization program reemerged as a top priority on Ceaușescu's agenda. The concept was first developed by Nikita Khrushchev, aiming to raise the standard of rural life by amalgamating villages in order to stop the migration of younger people from rural to urban. However, the project was forgotten while Ceaușescu focused on other projects, such as the Centrul Civic and the Danube–Black Sea Canal, but it was relaunched in March 1988. The 1974 law for urban and rural territorial reorganization provided for the development of the countryside by focusing on the more viable villages while the rest would be gradually starved of investment. However, momentum was lost in the late 1970s, and of the 140 new towns promised by 1985, only one – Rovinari – was completed in 1981. No explanation was ever given, but likely Ceaușescu transferred his attention to the aforementioned projects.

Details of the plan
The villages most likely to be phased out were those with minimal prospects for growth. By the year 2000, 85% of communes were to have piped drinking water and 82% modern sewage. According to a statement by the regime, by the year 2000, Romania expected "to eradicate basic differences between villages and cities and to ensure the harmonious development of all sections of the country". Ceauşescu's declared aim - based on an original idea in the Communist Manifesto - was "to wipe out radically the major differences between towns and villages; to bring the living and working conditions of the working people in the countryside closer to those in the towns". He thought that by gathering people together into apartment buildings so that "the community fully dominates and controls the individual", systematization would produce Romania's "new socialist man". Ceaușescu was determined to revolutionize agriculture by increasing the cultivation area, while also stifling individual initiative and increasing centralization. The peasants were to receive derisory compensation for their demolished homes and then be charged rent for their new blocks, in which there was no accommodation for animals. As Romanian historian Dinu Giurescu put it: "The ultimate goal is the proletarianization of our society. The final step in this process is the loss of the individual house.". It was an all-out effort at social engineering: kitchens and bathrooms were communal space in the government-owned and controlled apartments. The number of villages was to be reduced to 5,000–6,000 (grouped in 2,000 communes), implying that 7,000–8,000 would be destroyed. Workers and intellectuals were to be settled in 3–4 storey buildings, with small blocks of 4 apartments or individual two-storey houses for the farmers. The countryside would be urbanized through 558 new agro-industrial towns. Although aspects of the program were absolutely necessary (improvement of services, diversification and stabilization of the workforce), it allowed little scope for local consultation and its implementation timespan was far too short (hence compulsory resettlement) with no realistic compensation for the required expropriation.

The last stop: MFN status
Between 3 August 1975 and 3 July 1988, Romania was accorded most favoured nation status from the United States. In 1988, Ceaușescu renounced Romania's MFN status with the United States, just as the latter was about to suspend it over human rights violations. In July 1987, the United States Congress voted to suspend Romania's MFN status. Although the suspension was meant to last at least 6 months, in order to avoid further humiliation, Ceaușescu renounced his country's MFN status. More than 85 oral testimonies and 995 written statements were submitted to support the suspension of Romania's MFN status. On 26 February 1988, in order to save face, Romania announced that it did not need MFN status. The House and Senate votes were rejected as unacceptable "interference in the internal affairs" of Romania. To underline this rejection, the village-bulldozing program was made public in April 1988. Romania's renunciation of MFN status in February 1988 resulted from Ceaușescu's growing irritation with American pressure over Romania's human rights situation, such as Ceaușescu's treatment of his opponents. Ceaușescu's renunciation of MFN made its suspension by the United States Congress meaningless. His action showed that he would not submit to pressure from either side, East or West.

Implementation and results
Ceaușescu felt fed-up by continuous United States Congressional scrutiny of Romania's human rights record, a scrutiny hindering his long-cherished "grand design". Shortly after his "cocky" gesture on MFN, Ceaușescu announced the most sweeping and ominous plan of his regime up to that point, involving the liquidation of up to 8,000 villages. On 3 March 1988, speaking at an official conference, Ceaușescu announced: by the year 2000, 7,000 - 8,000 of Romania's 13,123 villages would be "modernized", as in transformed into 558 "agro-industrial" centers. The Ilfov Agricultural Sector around Bucharest was chosen by Ceaușescu as a showpiece (to be completed by 1992-1993), as a model for emulation by the rest of the country. The first evictions and demolitions took place in August 1988. Only 2-3 days were given before shops were closed down and bus services were stopped, forcing the inhabitants into the selected villages. Whole communities were moved to blocks in Otopeni and Ghermănești, where as much as 10 families had to share one kitchen and the sewage system had not been completed. In other villages across the country, "ugly" concrete Civic Center buildings began to emerge in the centers of the planned new towns. Around 18 villages had suffered major demolitions by the end of 1989 while 5 others were completely razed. According to the Wall Street Journal: "In the countryside, smashed hamlets and villages are making way for the same prefabricated housing blocks of Orwellian Bucharest.". The systematization program encountered resistance from villagers and local authorities alike. Local revolts against systematization were reported in the villages of Petrova, Monor and Parva. Local officials were threatened, while in other places officials refused to carry out orders. The director of the Miercurea Ciuc County Savings Bank resigned in protest over pressure to designate his native village of Păuleni-Ciuc a street of the nearby town of Frumoasa. The systematization program was terminated on 26 December 1989, the day after the trial and execution of Nicolae and Elena Ceaușescu.

Towns created under Systematization
The program fell behind schedule, with only 24 new towns declared in 1989 out of the 100 expected by 1990. These 24 agro-industrial towns are listed below:
Transylvania
Bihor County
Valea lui Mihai - Although agriculture remained predominant, small-scale industries were being developed. Around 30 apartment blocks were built in the center. 
Hunedoara County
Aninoasa - A mining center in the upper Jiu Valley. 
Maramureș County
Seini - Main industries: agriculture, animal breeding and fruit growing.  
Mureș County
Iernut
Sibiu County
Avrig - The Mechanical Works at Mârșa was the most important industrial plant in the area.
Tălmaciu - Several timber factories and a textile plant. Blocks totalling 480 apartments were built.

Wallachia
Argeș County
Colibași - Location of Automobile Dacia, Romania's first car manufacturing plant. Two national research institutes - for automotive engineering and nuclear technology - were also located there.   
Brăila County
Ianca - A model for agro-industrial towns in flat regions.
Însurăței - Blocks totalling 330 apartments were built, of which 200 were located in the center. 
Buzău County
Nehoiu - A model for agro-industrial towns in mountainous regions. 
Pogoanele - Blocks totalling 200 apartments were built in the center.
Călărași County
Budești
Lehliu Gară - Its main industrial plant was a subsidiary of a clothes factory based in Bucharest.
Fundulea - Three important agricultural research institutes were based there, most of their staff commuting from Bucharest.
Giurgiu County
Bolintin-Vale - A satellite of Bucharest.
Mihăilești - Most of the former village razed and rebuilt to make way for the Danube–Bucharest Canal. Visited by Ceaușescu multiple times. Blocks totalling 3,500 apartments were built.
Gorj County
Bumbești-Jiu
Rovinari - Already a town as of 9 December 1981.
Olt County
Piatra Olt
Scornicești - The town with the most impressive record of medals, distinctions and titles in Socialist Romania, including that of "Hero of the New Agrarian Revolution". The new town had a factory making automobile spare parts, a clothes factory, a brewery, a dairy plant and a poultry farm.         

Dobruja
Constanța County
Basarabi - An inland harbor for the Danube–Black Sea Canal. There were also two large wineries. 
Negru Vodă - Blocks totalling 341 apartments were built. 
Ovidiu

Moldavia
Bacău County
Dărmănești

Other rural settlements decisively impacted by Systematization which later became towns
Bragadiru, Cornetu, Balotești and Otopeni were likewise to become agro-industrial towns. Two hundred dump trucks were required to carry the rubble resulted from the demolition of many private houses in Otopeni, Dimieni and Odăile. In Bragadiru, Măgurele, Otopeni and 30 Decembrie blocks totalling thousands of apartments were built. Otopeni became a town on 28 November 2000. Bragadiru and Măgurele became towns on 29 December 2005.

International reactions

Hungary

In Hungary, the program is called "romániai falurombolás" (lit. "Romanian village destruction"). After May 1988, Transylvanian "atrocity stories" abounded in the Hungarian press. The Romanian regime drew unfavorable world opinion and came under increasing attack from the global press. In June 1988, 50,000 people protested in Budapest because the thousands of villages proposed for destruction by the Romanian Government included 1,500 ethnic Hungarian ones. That demonstration, taking place on 27 June, was the largest organized in Hungary after 1956. The plan was also criticised by leading members of the Hungarian Socialist Workers' Party. In retaliation for the 27 June protest rally held in Budapest, Ceaușescu closed the Hungarian consulate in Cluj. To address these issues, and to comply with Mikhail Gorbachev's request, Károly Grósz met with Ceaușescu in Arad on 28 August 1988. The talks were fruitless, with Ceaușescu unwilling to concede or compromise on any point. He simply used the fact that talks were being held at all as a means to win time and regain some of his lost credibility. The meeting was seen in Hungary as a capitulation of the country's national interests and significantly damaged Grósz's own prestige.

Opération Villages Roumains
The scale of the potential destruction caused an international outcry to such an extent that it led to the creation of organizations such as the Belgian-based Opération Villages Roumains, which provided for the twinning of threatened Romanian villages with Western communities. Few of the villages were actually destroyed, systematization only really succeeding in "imprinting Romania onto the consciousness of Europe". Opération Villages Roumains was founded on 22 December 1988 in Brussels, being officially launched on 3 February 1989. By the beginning of May 1989, Romanian villages had been adopted by 231 communes in Belgium, 95 in France, and 42 in Switzerland. The Belgian effort was almost exclusively Walloon. In its March 1989 session, the Council of Europe strongly condemned the liquidation of the villages, asking the authorities to cease the campaign. Shortly afterwards, in a speech broadcast by the BBC, the Prince of Wales publicly criticized this policy.

References 

Socialist Republic of Romania
Society of Romania
Urban planning in Romania
Nicolae Ceaușescu
Social engineering (political science)